Aibat is the second-largest of the six islands of the Zeila Archipelago. It has a lighthouse. It is a low and sandy island, with bushes, that is around 1.75 miles in length and around 0.55 miles in breadth. It is mostly surrounded by a reef. The island has an area of 1.58 square kilometers (158 hectares) and is located 1.9 kilometers north of Sacadin Island, the largest of the group, and about 21 kilometers east of the Djibouti border.

See also
Administrative divisions of Somaliland
Regions of Somaliland
Districts of Somaliland

Sacadin

References

Islands of Somaliland
Islands of Somalia